Bradley Clifford Roy Loree (born July 5, 1960) is a Canadian actor and stuntman. He is a member of Stunts Canada. He played Michael Myers in Halloween: Resurrection (2002).

Loree was born in Burnaby. He is 6 ft 2 in (1.88 m) tall.

Filmography
selected
The Cabin in the Woods stunt performer (2012)
Mr. Hush - Actor - Holland Price (2011)
Messages Deleted - stunt coordinator (2010)
Tron: Legacy - stunt performer (2010)
Tooth Fairy - stunt performer (2010)
The Twilight Saga: New Moon - stunt performer (2009)
2012 - stunt performer (2009)
Watchmen - stunt performer (2009)
Battlestar Galactica: Razor - stunt performer (2007)
Martian Child - stunt double for John Cusack (2007)
Fantastic Four: Rise of the Silver Surfer - stunt performer (2007)
X-Men: The Last Stand - stunt performer (2006)
Smallville: Lexmas - actor (2005)
Catwoman - stunt performer (2004)
Scooby Doo 2: Monsters Unleashed - stunt performer (2004)
White Chicks - Stunt performer, played Dealer Henchman (2004)
Stargate SG-1 - actor (2004)
X2: X-Men United - William Stryker (flashback scenes), stunt performer (2003)
Halloween: Resurrection - actor, co-stunt coordinator, Michael Myers (2002)
Smallville - stunt performer (2001,2002)
Los Luchadores - stunt double (2001)
Cats & Dogs - stunt performer (2001)
Get Carter - stunt performer (2000)
Mission to Mars - stunt performer (2000)
Shanghai Noon - stunt performer (2000)
Reindeer Games - stunt performer (2000)
The 13th Warrior - stunt performer (1999)
Futuresport - actor (1998)
Timecop - actor (1994)
Highlander: The Watchers - actor (1993)

References

External links

1960 births
Living people
Canadian stunt performers
Canadian male television actors
People from Burnaby
Male actors from British Columbia